Virginia Grant (9 August 1937 – 24 October 2017) was a Canadian swimmer. She competed in two events at the 1956 Summer Olympics. She won the 1956 British 'Open' ASA National Championship 100 metres freestyle title  and the 1955 and 1956 ASA National Championship 220 yards freestyle titles.

References

External links
 

1937 births
2017 deaths
Canadian female freestyle swimmers
Olympic swimmers of Canada
Swimmers at the 1956 Summer Olympics
Place of birth missing
Swimmers at the 1954 British Empire and Commonwealth Games
Commonwealth Games silver medallists for Canada
Commonwealth Games medallists in swimming
Swimmers at the 1955 Pan American Games
Pan American Games silver medalists for Canada
Pan American Games bronze medalists for Canada
Pan American Games medalists in swimming
Medalists at the 1955 Pan American Games
20th-century Canadian women
21st-century Canadian women
Medallists at the 1954 British Empire and Commonwealth Games